See Shashi for namesakes

Shashi is a district within the main urban area of Jingzhou, Hubei province, People's Republic of China. It is located on the left (northern) bank of the Yangtze River, between  Yichang and Wuhan.

History 
 Shashi was founded during the warring states period as an extension of the Chu capital Ying, its port on the Yangtze.
 In modern history it is notable as one of the four ports specified to be opened to the Empire of Japan in the Treaty of Shimonoseki (17 April 1895, which also ended Chinese imperial claims to Korea). The treaty port grew rapidly into  because of this, gaining the moniker of  "Little Hankow". Nonetheless, the opening of other coastal ports led to trade moving elsewhere and it gradually declined.

In 1994 it lost its status as a city and was combined with Jingzhou to form Jingsha city.

Administrative divisions 

Five subdistricts:
Zhongshan Subdistrict (/)
Chongwen Subdistrict (/)
Jiefang Subdistrict (/)
Shengli Subdistrict (/)
Chaoyang Subdistrict (/) (formerly: Lianhe Subdistrict)

Four towns:
Luochang
Cenhe
Guanyindang
Guanju

The only township is Lixin Township

Ecclesiastical history 
The Roman Catholic Apostolic Prefecture of Shashi or Shasi / Shasien(sis) (Latin adjective) was established on 7 July 1936, on territory split off from the then Apostolic Vicariate of Yichang (now a diocese), bordering on that, on the dioceses Hanyang and Puqi and on the Apostolic prefecture of Lixian.

It is a (dormant?) pre-diocesan Latin jurisdiction, which is exempt, i.e. directly subject to the Holy See and it missionary Roman Congregation for the Evangelization of Peoples, not part of any ecclesiastical province. No statistics available.

It is indefinitely vacant, without Apostolic administrator, since the death of its sole incumbent as Apostolic Prefect of Shashi :
 Father Julian Edward Dillon, Friars Minor (O.F.M.) (born USA) (1936.07.11 – death 1961.06.25).

See also 
 List of Catholic dioceses in China

References

Sources and external links 

 Official website of Shashi District government
 GCatholic

County-level divisions of Hubei
Jingzhou